Janusz Władysław Pałubicki (born 1948) is a Polish politician and activist.

Born in 1948 in Wałbrzych, Pałubicki studied history of art at the University of Poznań. From 1981 he was a member of Solidarity; in 1982 he became the leader of the Wielkopolska part of the movement. During the martial law in Poland (1981–1983) he was one of many Solidarity activists who were arrested and interned. From 1997 to 2001 he was a minister-coordinator of Polish secret services in the Solidarity Electoral Action (AWS) government of Jerzy Buzek. During that period he was also a deputy for Polish parliament, the Sejm.

References
  Janusz Pałubicki in Encyklopedia Solidarności

1948 births
Solidarity (Polish trade union) activists
Members of the Polish Sejm 1997–2001
Living people
Polish dissidents